Aline Friess (born 5 July 2003) is a French artistic gymnast. She competed with the French teams at the 2019 World Championships and the 2020 Summer Olympics.

Early life 
Friess was born on 5 July 2003 in Obernai. She began gymnastics in 2009 after she accompanied a friend to a training session. She moved from her club in Obernai to Saint-Étienne in 2016 and joined the French national team.

Junior career 
Friess made her international debut at the 2016 Élite Gym Massilia where she finished fourth with her team and twenty-fourth in the all-around.

2017 
At the Sainté Gym Cup, Friess helped the French team win the gold medal, and she won the silver medal in the all-around. She then won the gold medal in the all-around at the International GymSport in Sangalhos, Portugal, and she won the bronze medal on the balance beam and the floor exercise. Then at the French Championships, she won the silver medal in the all-around behind Célia Serber. She also placed eighth on the uneven bars and  seventh on the floor exercise. She helped the French team win the silver medal behind Italy at the FIT Challenge and placed eleventh in the all-around. She competed at the European Youth Olympic Festival but on vault, she was injured and had two fractures in her foot. She missed the rest of the season and did not return to training until March 2018.

2018 
Friess returned to competition in May at the French Championships where she competed on the vault, uneven bars, and floor exercise but did not qualify for any finals. In July, she competed at the Pieve di Soligo Friendly in Italy and finished sixteenth in the all-around and helped the French team placed second behind Italy. She was chosen as the alternate for the European Championships. However, when Julia Forestier had to withdraw due to an injury, Friess was put on the team. She competed on the uneven bars with a score of 12.900 and balance beam with a score of 10.933, helping the team finish fifth. In November, she competed at Élite Gym Massilia where she won the team gold medal and finished twelfth in the all-around, fourth on vault, and she won a bronze medal on balance beam.

Senior career

2019 
Friess became age-eligible for senior competition in 2019. She made her senior debut at the EnBW DTB-Pokal Team Challenge in Stuttgart where France placed fourth in the team final. Then at the French Championships, she finished fourth in the all-around and on the floor exercise. She was selected to compete at the European Games alongside Lorette Charpy and Carolann Héduit. She finished fourth in the all-around final, just less than a tenth away from making the podium with a score of 52.699. She then competed at the Worms Friendly where the French team finished third behind Germany and Belgium, and she won the silver medal in the all-around behind Elisabeth Seitz. She was named to the World Championships team alongside Marine Boyer, Lorette Charpy, Melanie de Jesus dos Santos, and Claire Pontlevoy. The team finished fifth in the team final and qualified France for a team spot at the 2020 Olympic Games. Friess qualified for the all-around final where she finished eleventh with a score of 54.798.

2020
In late January, it was announced that Friess would compete at the Stuttgart World Cup taking place in March. The Stuttgart World Cup was later canceled due to the COVID-19 pandemic in Germany. She injured her knee in October and had surgery, causing her to miss the rest of the season.

2021
Friess returned to competition at the Ukraine International Cup and won gold medals in the all-around and on the floor exercise. She then competed at the FIT Challenge and helped the French team win the gold medal. Individually, Friess won the silver medal in the all-around behind Mélanie de Jesus dos Santos, and she placed fifth on the uneven bars and eighth on the balance beam. On 14 June, she was selected to represent France at the 2020 Summer Olympics alongside Mélanie de Jesus dos Santos, Marine Boyer, and Carolann Héduit. At the Olympics, she helped France qualify to the team final where they finished sixth.

2022
In May, Friess competed at the Varna World Challenge Cup in Bulgaria, where she qualified to all four event finals. During the finals, she won three gold medals on vault, uneven bars and floor exercise, and also picked up a bronze on balance beam.

In August Friess competed at the European Championships in Munich, where France finished sixth in the team final. Individually, she qualified to the vault final, where she won the bronze medal behind Zsófia Kovács and Asia D'Amato.  In October Friess was named to the team to compete at the World Championships in Liverpool alongside Marine Boyer, Mélanie de Jesus dos Santos, Coline Devillard, and Carolann Héduit.

Personal life
Friess speaks French, English, and Spanish. Outside of gymnastics, she also plays ping-pong and badminton. She is currently studying at Emlyon Business School.

Competitive history

References

External links 
 
 

2003 births
Living people
French female artistic gymnasts
Gymnasts at the 2019 European Games
European Games competitors for France
People from Obernai
Gymnasts at the 2020 Summer Olympics
Olympic gymnasts of France
Sportspeople from Bas-Rhin
21st-century French women